Mac Dalgleish (June 12, 1901 – December 31, 1974) was an American sound engineer. He was nominated for an Academy Award in the category Sound Recording for the film Voice in the Wind.

Selected filmography
 Voice in the Wind (1944)

References

External links

1901 births
1974 deaths
American audio engineers
People from California
20th-century American engineers